Sonallis Mayan (born 12 February 1973) is a Cuban taekwondo practitioner. She competed at the 2000 Summer Olympics in Sydney. 

She won a gold medal in heavyweight at the 1999 Pan American Games.

References

External links

1973 births
Living people
Cuban female taekwondo practitioners
Olympic taekwondo practitioners of Cuba
Taekwondo practitioners at the 2000 Summer Olympics
Pan American Games medalists in taekwondo
Pan American Games gold medalists for Cuba
Taekwondo practitioners at the 1995 Pan American Games
Taekwondo practitioners at the 1999 Pan American Games
Medalists at the 1995 Pan American Games
Medalists at the 1999 Pan American Games
20th-century Cuban women